The English Open was a professional golf tournament on the European Tour from 1988 to 2002.

English Open may also refer to:
Brabazon Trophy, contested for in the English Men's Open Amateur Stroke Play Championship
English Open (snooker)
English Open (table tennis)

See also 
English Opening, a chess opening that begins with the move 1. c4